The Legend of Jimmy Blue Eyes is a 1964 short film directed by Robert Clouse.

Summary
'In Storyville, where blues were born/ There's a legend of a golden horn/ And a hot-lipped kid, blue-eyed and fair/ Who tried for a note that wasn't there.'

Production
Teddy Buckner composed the film score. Janee Michelle had her film acting debut in the film. John A. Alonzo, who would later become best known for his camerawork for Chinatown, served as the cinematographer for The Legend of Jimmy Blue Eyes.

Accolades
The film was screened at the 1965 Cannes Film Festival. The film was nominated for the Academy Award for Best Live Action Short Film at the 37th Academy Awards, but lost to Casals Conducts: 1964. The Legend of Jimmy Blue Eyes was Clouse's second film to be nominated for this award, the first being the 1962 film The Cadillac.

References

Bibliography

External links
 
 
 The film on Lynne Whelden's official YouTube channel

1964 films
American short films
1964 short films
Films directed by Robert Clouse
African-American films
Jazz films
The Devil in film
Films set in 1935
Films set in the 1930s
1960s rediscovered films
Rediscovered American films
1960s English-language films
1964 independent films
American independent films